Mission: Impossible vs. the Mob is a 1967 American spy film. It is the first film based on the television series Mission: Impossible, consisting of a compilation of a two-part episode of the original series from 1967 called "The Council".

The film was released in parts of Europe and Australia. Theatrical posters were released for its screening in Australia.

Cast

See also
 The Man from U.N.C.L.E.#Feature films, another spy-themed TV-series with several offshoot movies made of episodes from the series
 List of American films of 1967

References

Further reading

External links

1960s action films
Films edited from television programs
Films scored by Lalo Schifrin
Mission: Impossible films
1960s English-language films